Kiseki Films was an anime licensing and distribution company created in 1993 that marketed and distributed anime in the UK, Ireland, Australia and New Zealand. In 2001, the company was bought by British home entertainment distribution company Revelation Films and ceased operations.

References

Anime companies
Mass media companies established in 1993
Mass media companies disestablished in 2001